Bruno Sandras (born 4 August 1961) is a French Polynesian politician and former Cabinet Minister. He was a member of the National Assembly of France from 2007 to 2012, representing the 2nd constituency of French Polynesia, as a member of the Union for a Popular Movement. He was Mayor of papara from 2001 until 2014, when he was dismissed from office after he was convicted of corruption.

Sandras was born in Papeete in French Polynesia. After training as a lawyer he was general secretary of the A Tia I Mua trade union confederation from 1995 to 2000. He was elected Mayor of Papara in 2001. From 2001 to 2005 he was a member of the Assembly of French Polynesia.

In February 2005 following Jean-Christophe Bouissou's resignation he was appointed to cabinet in Gaston Flosse's government, taking over Buissou's portfolios.

He was elected to the French Assembly in the 2007 French legislative election as a candidate for the UMP. In the assembly he campaigned to retain a French military presence in French Polynesia, and for compensation for French nuclear testing. In 2010 the Nouvelles de Tahiti claimed he was one of the most passive delegates in the assembly, ranking him 516th of 577 members. In 2011 he attended sittings for only 5 weeks. He stood for re-election at the 2012 election, but was eliminated in the first round. Following his departure from the national assembly he worked as a civil servant for the French Polynesian government.

He was re-elected as Mayor of Papara in 2008. In April 2009 he quit Tahoera'a Huiraatira, announcing plans to form a new party. In September 2009 he launched the Ia Hau Noa party. In February 2013 he quit the A Tia Porinetia party after a dispute over his ranking on the party list. In 2014 he was re-elected as mayor of Papara.

At the 2018 French Polynesian legislative election he attempted to establish a party list with La République En Marche!, before signing a coalition agreement with Tahoera'a Huiraatira.

Corruption charges
In December 2009 he was ordered to pay US$100,000 after a court found that the government had unlawfully spent public funds. The order was overturned in 2011. In October 2011 he was convicted for his involvement in the "phantom jobs" scandal and sentenced to a suspended sentence of three months imprisonment and banned from office.  The conviction was upheld on appeal in 2014. A further appeal against the ban was rejected in 2015. Following the appeal he was removed as Mayor of Papara.

References

1961 births
Living people
People from Papeete
Mayors of places in French Polynesia
French Polynesian politicians
Energy ministers of French Polynesia
Environment ministers of French Polynesia
Transport ministers of French Polynesia
Union for a Popular Movement politicians
Tahoera'a Huiraatira politicians
Deputies of the 13th National Assembly of the French Fifth Republic
French politicians convicted of crimes